Ibu Pertiwiku is the official state anthem of Sarawak, Malaysia. The song was adopted in 1988, alongside the adoption of the new State Flag as well, in conjunction with the 25th anniversary of Sarawak's Independence within Malaysia. The music was composed by Sarawak songwriter Dato' Haji Wan Othman, while the lyrics were written by Ismail Hassan.

Timeline

Historical background 
Sarawak had adopted 3 anthems prior: Gone Forth Beyond the Sea (National), Fair Land Sarawak (Colonial and State) and Sarawak Bahagia (State).

Gone Forth Beyond the Sea 
"Gone Forth Beyond the Sea" was the National Anthem of the Raj of Sarawak. It was composed in 1872 by Margaret of Sarawak, in honour of Charles of Sarawak, and was in use until the Raj was ceded to the United Kingdom in 1946 and become its crown colony.

Gone forth beyond the sea
To clime... as yet unknown,
Where calls are made for thee,
To bear the sword and crown.

Advance, God speed, to save,
Creatures in jungles deep,
God's hand shall help the brave,
Tho'man's may rest in sleep,
Let Justice signalise,
And ev'..ry voice resound,
Who by the Eastern crown'd.

Tho'past and gone in light,
Thy name is still renown''d,
And as a chief in might,
Thy deeds are ever crown'd,
Let echoing vales redound,
By mountain, crag and nook,
Sing loud with joyous sound,
God Bless the Rajah Brooke.

Fair Land Sarawak 

"Fair Land Sarawak" was the anthem of Sarawak as a British Crown Colony from 1946 until 1963 and the anthem of Sarawak as a state of Malaysia from 1963 until 1973. The lyrics of the anthem were provided by F.C. Ogden, while the tune of the anthem provided by George R.K. Freeth, is identical to that of the anthem of the Raj of Sarawak – "Gone Forth Beyond the Sea".

Fair Land Sarawak
We will never cease to honour thee
and with our loyal sons
Defend your liberty

From your high forest hills,
Down to the open sea
May freedom ever reign
Men live in unity

Proudly our Flag flies high
above our Country strong and free
Long may our Peoples live
in peace and harmony

Sarawak Bahagia 

"Sarawak Bahagia" (Happy Sarawak) was the state anthem of Sarawak from 1973 until 1988. It was the first anthem in the state to be rendered in Malay language.

Lyrics

See also
 Ibu Pertiwi

References

External links
 Sarawak state anthem "Ibu Pertiwiku" on YouTube

Sarawak
Anthems of Malaysia
1988 establishments in Malaysia